The Importance of Being Little: What Preschoolers Really Need from Grownups is a 2016 book written by early childhood educator Erika Christakis that argues the importance of separating childhood from adulthood. It was published by Viking Press.

References

Further reading

External links 
 

2016 non-fiction books
Books about education
Early childhood education
Parenting advice books
Viking Press books
American non-fiction books